The Leuni were an ancient Celtic tribe of Gallaecia,  living in the north of modern Portugal, in the province of Minho, between the rivers Lima and Minho.

See also
Pre-Roman peoples of the Iberian Peninsula

External links
Detailed map of the Pre-Roman Peoples of Iberia (around 200 BC)

Tribes of Gallaecia
Ancient peoples of Portugal